Barnaba Adorno (Genoa, 1385 - Genoa, 1459) was the 30th Doge of the Republic of Genoa.

Biography 
Born in Genoa around 1385, he was the nephew of the former Doges Giorgio Adorno and Antoniotto Adorno, the latter elected to the dogal office four times. Engaged in commercial traffic in the eastern Genoese colonies, especially in Chios, he participated together with other members of his family in military operations against the dominion of the Visconti family in the territories of the Republic of Genoa.

Upon the resignation of his cousin Raffaele Adorno, Barnaba Adorno took over as the new Doge of Genoa, the thirtieth in republican history. This mandate, however, even for the opposition maneuvers of the Fregosos, did not last even a month and on January 30 forced him to flee the Genoese capital.

Adorno presumably died in Genoa in 1459.

See also 

 Doge of Genoa
 Republic of Genoa
 Adorno family

References 

1385 births
1459 deaths
15th-century Doges of Genoa